The Doll with Millions is a 1928 Soviet silent comedy film starring Igor Ilyinsky.

Plot
In Paris, a millionaire widow Madame Collie has died. All her property stored in the will should go to the granddaughter of the deceased - Maria Ivanova, who lives in Moscow. The girl has also inherited shares of "Trippoli Channel" worth millions hidden in a doll. Pierre and Paul Cuisinai, who believe that they have been unfairly left out of the will, set off to Moscow to find Maria and propose to her in order to earn a fortune.

Cast

Igor Ilyinsky as Pierre Cuisinai
Vladimir Fogel as Paul Cuisinai
Galina Kravchenko as Blanche
Ada Vojtsik as Maria Ivanova
Vladimir Chuvelyov
Aleksandr Gromov
Sergey Komarov
Pavel Poltoratskiy

References

Bibliography 
 Christie, Ian & Taylor, Richard. The Film Factory: Russian and Soviet Cinema in Documents 1896-1939. Routledge, 2012.

External links

1928 comedy films
1928 films
Soviet comedy films
Russian comedy films
Gorky Film Studio films
Soviet black-and-white films
Soviet silent feature films
Russian black-and-white films
Russian silent feature films
Silent comedy films